Apyrauna annulicornis is a species of longhorn beetle in the Elaphidiini subfamily. It was described by Martins in 2005. It is endemic to Isla de Cauropot, Brazil.

References

Elaphidiini
Beetles described in 2005
Endemic fauna of Brazil